Garrett Wilson (born July 22, 2000) is an American football wide receiver for the New York Jets of the National Football League (NFL). He played college football at Ohio State and was drafted 10th overall by the Jets in the 2022 NFL Draft.

Early life and high school career
Wilson was born on July 22, 2000, in Columbus, Ohio and grew up in Chicago, Illinois and Ohio. He moved from Dublin, Ohio, to Texas at age 11. He attended Lake Travis High School in Austin, Texas, winning a 6A state championship along with Charlie Brewer in 2016; Wilson would go on to break multiple Lake Travis wide receiver records, including total career receptions (204), total yards (3,359) and total touchdowns (55). Wilson played in the 2019 All-American Bowl. Coming out of high school, Wilson was a 5 star recruit, was ranked the nations #2 receiver, and the nations number 20 overall player. He committed to play college football at Ohio State University.

College career
As a true freshman at Ohio State in 2019, Wilson played in all 14 games and had 30 receptions for 432 yards and five touchdowns. Entering 2020, he was moved from an outside receiver to slot receiver. On November 21, 2020, Wilson became the second player in school history to record four straight games with at least 100 yards receiving. On December 27, 2021, Wilson announced that he would be opting out of the 2022 Rose Bowl and declaring for the 2022 NFL Draft.

College statistics

Professional career

Wilson was drafted in the first round with the 10th overall by the New York Jets in the 2022 NFL Draft. The Jets used the selection that was previously obtained in a 2020 trade that sent Jamal Adams to the Seattle Seahawks. He made his NFL debut in Week 1 against the Baltimore Ravens. In Week 2, against the Cleveland Browns, he recorded his first two NFL touchdowns as part of an eight-reception, 102-yard performance in the 31–30 victory. In Week 8, against the New England Patriots, he had six receptions for 115 receiving yards in the 22–17 loss. In Week 12, against the Chicago Bears, he had two receiving touchdowns in the 31–10 victory. In Week 13, against the Minnesota Vikings, he had eight receptions for 162 receiving yards in the 27–22 loss. He finished his rookie season with 83 receptions for 1,103 receiving yards and four receiving touchdowns. He set franchise rookie records for receptions and receiving yards in a single season. He was named to the PFWA All-Rookie Team.

On February 9, 2023, Wilson was awarded the Associated Press NFL Offensive Rookie of the Year.

NFL career statistics

Personal
Wilson's father, Kenny Wilson, played basketball at Davidson College.

References

External links

New York Jets bio
Ohio State Buckeyes bio

Living people
Players of American football from Austin, Texas
American football wide receivers
Ohio State Buckeyes football players
2000 births
All-American college football players
New York Jets players
Players of American football from Chicago
National Football League Offensive Rookie of the Year Award winners